Pereskia aculeata is a scrambling shrub in the family Cactaceae. Common names include Barbados gooseberry, blade-apple cactus, leaf cactus, rose cactus, and lemonvine. It is native to tropical America.

Description
Like other members of the genus Pereskia, these plants are unusual cacti with spiny non-succulent stems and large leaves.

Younger stems have hooked thorns and older stems have clusters of woody spines. The strongly scented flowers are white, cream or pinkish,  diameter, and numerous, produced in panicles. The leaves are edible, containing 20 to 30% of protein in the dry leaf matter. The fruits are also edible, containing numerous small seeds. It somewhat resembles the gooseberry in appearance and is of excellent flavor.

Distribution

Native
South America, including French Guiana, Guyana, Suriname, Venezuela, Brazil, Colombia, Argentina and Paraguay.

Introduced
Considered naturalized in the United States, Mexico, Central America, and the Caribbean. Also introduced to China, India, South Africa, Vietnam, Hawaii, Palau, French Polynesia, and Australia.

Ecological significance
A flea-beetle (Phenrica guerini), a leaf-mining moth (Epipagis cambogialis), and a stem-wilter, (Catorhintha schaffneri), feed on the leaves.

Although Pereskia aculeata is edible and of high nutrition quality, being an alternative to conventional food, this plant is a declared weed in South Africa where it does extensive damage to forest areas by smothering indigenous trees. Infestations occur in some KwaZulu-Natal forests and are embedded in the canopy and difficult to remove. The plant has a tendency to form large, impenetrable clumps and the spines on the stems make control of large infestations difficult. The plants can regrow from leaves or pieces of stem. One specimen that had infested a tree had its stems cut at the base, but after four years the 'dry' stems of the Pereskia that fell from the tree still set root and regrew.

Control
These plants are extremely difficult to kill and eradicate. It can be controlled by triclopyr, or through biological control with the flea-beetle  Phenrica guerini. The flea-beetle has caused significant damage to Pereskia plants at Port Alfred, Eastern Cape, South Africa, and was also released widely in KwaZulu-Natal, but has not become established there.

Gallery

References

External Links 
 Grocer's Encyclopedia: The Encyclopedia of Food and Beverage, by Artemas Ward, New York, 1911.
 http://www.hear.org/Pier/wra/pacific/pereskia_aculeata_htmlwra.htm
 Pooley, E. (1998). A Field Guide to Wild Flowers; KwaZulu-Natal and the Eastern Region. .

Pereskioideae
Cacti of North America
Cacti of South America
Flora of Central America
Flora of the Caribbean
Least concern plants
Taxa named by Philip Miller